Močiar is a village and municipality in Banská Štiavnica District, in the Banská Bystrica Region of Slovakia.

Demographics
In 2019, the village had a population of 160.

References

Villages and municipalities in Banská Štiavnica District